is a retired Japanese breaststroke swimmer. He competed in the 100 m and 200 m breaststroke and 4 × 100 m medley relay at the 1968, 1972 and 1976 Olympics and won two medals in 1972, a gold in the 100 m and a bronze in the 200 m events. His breaststroke gold medal was the first for Japan since 1956. He won during the five-year era dominated by John Hencken and David Wilkie. He also earned the bronze medal in the 200 m breaststroke at the 1972 Olympics and in both breaststrokes at the 1975 World Championships. He ended his career after the 1976 Olympics.

Later life 
In 1987 he was inducted into the International Swimming Hall of Fame.

He became a lecturer at the National Institute of Fitness and Sports in Kanoya in 1984, and a professor of physical education in 1993. He became professor emeritus in 2017.

See also
 List of members of the International Swimming Hall of Fame

References

1951 births
Living people
Olympic gold medalists for Japan
Olympic bronze medalists for Japan
Olympic swimmers of Japan
Swimmers at the 1968 Summer Olympics
Swimmers at the 1972 Summer Olympics
Swimmers at the 1976 Summer Olympics
People from Saijō, Ehime
Sportspeople from Ehime Prefecture
World record setters in swimming
Olympic bronze medalists in swimming
World Aquatics Championships medalists in swimming
Asian Games medalists in swimming
Swimmers at the 1970 Asian Games
Swimmers at the 1974 Asian Games
Medalists at the 1972 Summer Olympics
Asian Games gold medalists for Japan
Japanese male breaststroke swimmers
Olympic gold medalists in swimming
Medalists at the 1970 Asian Games
Medalists at the 1974 Asian Games
Universiade medalists in swimming
Universiade silver medalists for Japan
Universiade bronze medalists for Japan
Academic staff of National Institute of Fitness and Sports in Kanoya
Medalists at the 1970 Summer Universiade
20th-century Japanese people